Monoplex comptus is a species of predatory sea snail, a marine gastropod mollusk in the family Cymatiidae.

Description

Description 
The maximum recorded shell length is 34 mm.

Habitat 
Minimum recorded depth is 2 m. Maximum recorded depth is 214 m.

References

Cymatiidae
Gastropods described in 1855